Vortex is a 1978 novel written by Australian author Jon Cleary about a tornado attack on a Missouri small town. Cleary wrote a screenplay based on it but no movie resulted.

References

External links
The novel was serialised in 6 parts in the Australian Woman's Weekly – Part 1, Part 2, Part 3, Part 4, Part 5
Vortex at AustLit (subscription required)

Novels first published in serial form
1978 Australian novels
Novels set in Missouri
William Collins, Sons books
William Morrow and Company books
Novels by Jon Cleary